Rayo's number is a large number named after Mexican philosophy professor Agustín Rayo which has been claimed to be the largest named number. It was originally defined in a "big number duel" at MIT on 26 January 2007.

Definition 
The definition of Rayo's number is a variation on the definition:

The smallest number bigger than any finite number named by an expression in the language of first-order set theory with a googol symbols or less.

Specifically, an initial version of the definition, which was later clarified, read "The smallest number bigger than any number that can be named by an expression in the language of first-order set-theory with less than a googol (10100) symbols."

The formal definition of the number uses the following second-order formula, where [φ] is a Gödel-coded formula and s is a variable assignment:
For all R { 
{for any (coded) formula [ψ] and any variable assignment t 
(R([ψ],t) ↔
(([ψ] = "xi ∈ xj" ∧ t(xi) ∈ t(xj)) ∨
([ψ] = "xi = xj" ∧ t(xi) = t(xj)) ∨
([ψ] = "(~θ)" ∧ ∼R([θ],t)) ∨
([ψ] = "(θ∧ξ)" ∧ R([θ],t) ∧ R([ξ],t)) ∨ 
([ψ] = "∃xi (θ)" and, for some an xi-variant t' of t, R([θ],t'))
)}   → 
R([φ],s)} 
Given this formula, Rayo's number is defined as:

The smallest number bigger than every finite number m with the following property: there is a formula φ(x1) in the language of first-order set-theory (as presented in the definition of Sat) with less than a googol symbols and x1 as its only free variable such that: (a) there is a variable assignment s assigning m to x1 such that Sat([φ(x1)],s), and (b) for any variable assignment t, if Sat([φ(x1)],t), then t assigns m to x1.

Explanation 
Intuitively, Rayo's number is defined in a formal language, such that:
 "xi∈xj" and "xi=xj" are atomic formulas.
 If θ is a formula, then "(~θ)" is a formula (the negation of θ).
 If θ and ξ are formulas, then "(θ∧ξ)" is a formula (the conjunction of θ and ξ).
 If θ is a formula, then "∃xi(θ)" is a formula (existential quantification).
Notice that it is not allowed to eliminate parenthesis. For instance, one must write "∃xi((~θ))" instead of "∃xi(~θ)".

It is possible to express the missing logical connectives in this language. For instance:
 Disjunction: "(θ∨ξ)" as "(~((~θ)∧(~ξ)))".
 Implication: "(θ⇒ξ)" as "(~(θ∧(~ξ)))".
 Biconditional: "(θ⇔ξ)" as "((~(θ∧ξ))∧(~((~θ)∧(~ξ))))".
 Universal quantification: "∀xi(θ)" as "(~∃xi((~θ)))".

The definition concerns formulas in this language that have only one free variable, specifically x1. If a formula with length n is satisfied iff x1 is equal to the finite von Neumann ordinal k, we say such a formula is a "Rayo string" for k, and that k is "Rayo-nameable" in n symbols. Then, Rayo(n) is defined as the smallest k greater than all numbers Rayo-nameable in at most n symbols.

Examples 
To Rayo-name 0, which is the empty set, one can write "(¬∃x2(x2∈x1))", which has 10 symbols. It can be shown that this is the optimal Rayo string for 0.  Similarly, (∃x2(x2∈x1)∧(¬∃x2((x2∈x1∧∃x3(x3∈x2))))), which has 30 symbols, is the optimal string for 1.  Therefore, Rayo(n)=0 for 0≤n<10, and Rayo(n)=1 for 10≤n<30.

Additionally, it can be shown that Rayo(34+20n)>n and Rayo(260+20n)>n2.

References 

Large integers